The women's 200 metres event at the 1981 Summer Universiade was held at the Stadionul Naţional in Bucharest on 23, 24 and 25 July 1981.

Medalists

Results

Heats

Wind:Heat 1: +1.0 m/s, Heat 2: +1.6 m/s, Heat 3: +1.7 m/s, Heat 4: +0.8 m/s

Semifinals

Wind:Heat 1: ? m/s, Heat 2: ? m/s

Final

Wind: +1.0 m/s

References

Athletics at the 1981 Summer Universiade
1981